Grdeša (1150–51) or Grd, was the župan (count) of Travunija, mentioned in 1150–51 as serving Grand Prince Uroš II of Serbia.

It is believed that Grdeša was born around 1120. In 1150 he was one of the military commanders in the army of Uroš II of Serbia that fought the Byzantine Empire; the combined Serbo-Hungarian army suffered defeat at the Battle of Tara, where Grdeša and fellow Duke Vučina (Bучинa) where captured. It is assumed the prisoners were taken to Sredets (Sofia), but were released in 1151. The death of Grd is placed in 1178 or around 1180. He had a son, župan Pribilša, who "died in the time of Stephen Vladislav I of Serbia".

His tomb (stećak) was found at the local community of Police in Trebinje. The tablet mentions him "in the days of Grand Prince Mihailo" as the župan of Trebinje, and also his brother župan Radomir (Радомир), and his family. The stećak is the oldest found and is currently held at the Museum of Herzegovina in Trebinje. A spur of his is in the collection of the National Museum in Sarajevo.

A charter, believed to be written in 1151, was found, and in it Desa, the younger brother of Uroš II, gifted the island of Mljet to the monastery of Saint Mary in Apulia, of which witnesses were "iupanus Gerdessa, Desimir, setnicus Rastessa, iupanos Grubessa, Petrus comes Raguseorum...", however, this was proven to be a falsification dating from the 13th century.

References

Sources

Further reading

12th-century Serbian nobility
People of the Grand Principality of Serbia
Medieval Serbian military leaders
Lords of Serbia in the Middle Ages
People from Trebinje
Medieval Bosnia and Herzegovina
Medieval literature of Bosnia and Herzegovina
Texts of medieval Bosnia and Herzegovina